Confrontation analysis (also known as dilemma analysis) is an operational analysis technique used to structure, understand and think through multi-party interactions such as negotiations. It is the underpinning mathematical basis of drama theory. 

It is derived from game theory but considers that instead of resolving the game, the players often redefine the game when interacting. Emotions triggered from the potential interaction play a large part in this redefinition. So whereas game theory looks on an interaction as a single decision matrix and resolves that, confrontation analysis looks on the interaction as a sequence of linked interactions, where the decision matrix changes under the influence of precisely defined emotional dilemmas.

Derivation and use

Confrontation analysis was devised by Professor Nigel Howard in the early 1990s drawing from his work on game theory and metagame analysis. It has been turned to defence, political, legal, financial and commercial  applications.

Much of the theoretical background to General Rupert Smith's book The Utility of Force drew its inspiration from the theory of confrontation analysis.

Confrontation analysis can also be used in a decision workshop as structure to support role-playing for training, analysis and decision rehearsal.

Method 

Confrontation analysis looks on an interaction as a sequence of confrontations. During each confrontation the parties communicate until they have made their positions clear to one another.  These positions can be expressed as a card table (also known as an options board) of yes/no decisions. For each decision each party communicates what they would like to happen (their position) and what will happen if they cannot agree (the threatened future). These interactions produce dilemmas and the card table changes as players attempt to eliminate these.

Consider the example on the right (Initial Card Table), taken from the 1995 Bosnian Conflict. This represents an interaction between the Bosnian Serbs and the United Nations forces over the safe areas. The Bosnian Serbs had Bosniak enclaves surrounded and were threatening to attack.

Each side had a position as to what they wanted to happen:

The Bosnian Serbs wanted (see 4th column):
 To be able to attack the enclaves
 NOT to withdraw their heavy weapons from the enclaves
 For the UN NOT to use air strikes
The UN wanted (See 5th column):
 The Bosnian Serbs NOT to attack the enclaves
 The Bosnian Serbs to withdraw their heavy weapons
 The Bosnian Serbs NOT to take hostages.
If no further changes were made then what the sides were saying would happen was (see 1st column):
The Bosnian Serbs said they would attack the enclaves
The Bosnian Serbs said they would NOT withdraw their heavy weapons
The Bosnian Serbs said they would take hostages if the UN uses air strikes
The UN said it would initiate air strikes.  However the Bosnian Serbs DID NOT BELIEVE them. (Hence the question mark on the Card Table).

Confrontation analysis then specifies a number of precisely defined dilemmas that occur to the parties following from the structure of the card tables.  It states that motivated by the desire to eliminate these dilemmas, the parties involved will CHANGE THE CARD TABLE, to eliminate their problem.

In the situation at the start the Bosnian Serbs have no dilemmas, but the UN has four. It has three persuasion dilemmas in that the Bosnian Serbs are not going to do the three things they want them to (not attack the enclaves, withdraw the heavy weapons and not take hostages). It also has a rejection dilemma in that the Bosnian Serbs do not believe they will actually use the air strikes, as they think the UN will submit to their position, for fear of having hostages taken.

Faced with these dilemmas, the UN modified the card table to eliminate its dilemmas.  It took two actions:

Firstly, it withdrew its forces from the positions where they were vulnerable to being taken hostage.  This action eliminated the Bosnian Serbs' option (card) of taking hostages.

Secondly, with the addition of the Rapid Reaction Force, and in particular its artillery the UN had an additional capability to engage Bosnian Serb weapons; they added the card "Use artillery against Bosnian Serbs". Because of this, the UN's threat of air strikes became more credible.  The situation changed to that of the Second Card Table:

The Bosnian Serbs wanted (see 4th column):
 To be able to attack the enclaves
 NOT to withdraw heavy weapons from the enclaves
 For the UN NOT to use air strikes
 For the UN NOT to use artillery
The UN wanted (See 5th column):
 The Bosnian Serbs NOT to attack the enclaves
 The Bosnian Serbs to withdraw their heavy weapons
If no further changes were made then what the sides were saying would happen was (see 1st column):
The Bosnian Serbs said they would attack the enclaves, but the UN did not believe them.
The Bosnian Serbs said they would NOT withdraw their heavy weapons, but the UN did not believe them.
The UN said it would use artillery.  The Bosnian Serbs believed this.
The UN said it would use air strikes.  This time, however, the Bosnian Serbs believed them.

Faced with this new situation, the Bosnian Serbs modified their position to accept the UN proposal.  The final table was an agreement as shown in the Final Card table (see thumbnail and picture).

Confrontation analysis does not necessarily produce a win-win solution (although end states are more likely to remain stable if they do); however, the word confrontation should not necessarily imply that any negotiations should be carried out in an aggressive way.

The card tables are isomorphic to game theory models, but are not built with the aim of finding a solution. Instead, the aim is to find the dilemmas facing characters and so help to predict how they will change the table itself. Such prediction requires not only analysis of the model and its dilemmas, but also exploration of the reality outside the model; without this it is impossible to decide which ways of changing the model in order to eliminate dilemmas might be rationalized by the characters.

Sometimes analysis of the ticks and crosses can be supported by values showing the payoff to each of the parties.

References

External links
 Dilemmas Galore – A user discussion group.  Deals with applications of Confrontation analysis to current politics, military campaigns, business problems, psychology, etc. Also contains a good introduction and glossary of the terms used in Confrontation Analysis.
Dilemma Explorer - A software application to do Confrontation Analysis
Confrontation Manager — A software application using an earlier version of Confrontation Analysis.
Confronteer an iPhone app to do Confrontation Analysis.
 N. Howard, 'Confrontation Analysis: How to win operations other than war', CCRP Publications, 1999.
 P. Bennett, J. Bryant and N. Howard, 'Drama Theory and Confrontation Analysis' — can be found (along with other recent PSM methods) in: J. V. Rosenhead and J. Mingers (eds) Rational Analysis for a Problematic World Revisited: problem structuring methods for complexity, uncertainty and conflict, Wiley, 2001.
 J. Bryant, The Six Dilemmas of Collaboration: inter-organisational relationships as drama, Wiley, 2003.
 N. Howard, Paradoxes of Rationality', MIT Press, 1971.
 How to structure disputes using Confrontation Analysis contains an illustrated explanation of Confrontation Analysis.
 Speed Confrontation Management a brief "How to" manual on doing Confrontation Analysis without using an Options Table.

Formal sciences
Game theory
Operations research
Problem structuring methods